Huya Live is a Chinese video live streaming service. The site is one of the largest of its kind in China, and also operates globally as Nimo TV. Similar to other streaming services like Loco, the site primarily focuses on video game live streaming and includes official broadcasts of esports competitions. In addition, Huya also has live broadcasts for a variety of other genres, including cooking, traditional sports and "real life" streams.

History 
On 24 November 2014, it was announced that YY.com's video streaming service would begin operating independently as Huya Live.

On 4 January 2018, Riot Games gave Huya Live exclusive rights to broadcast the LCK, South Korea's professional esports league for League of Legends, in China. The same was done for the LCS and LEC on 20 January 2020, the equivalent leagues in North America and Europe respectively.

Huya had 150 million monthly active users at the start of 2019.

In April 2020, Tencent became the largest shareholder of Huya, having increased its voting power to 50.1% which reduced JOYY's voting stake from 55.5% to 43%.

The mobile app of Huya was banned in India (along with other Chinese apps) on 2 September 2020 by the government, the move came amid the 2020 China-India skirmish.

Nimo TV 

Nimo TV is the global name of Huya Live. Nimo TV is the most used streaming platform in multiple countries such as Brazil, Indonesia, and Vietnam.

See also 
 DouYu

References

External links 
 

2014 establishments in China
Chinese brands
Chinese entertainment websites
Entertainment companies established in 2014
Internet properties established in 2014
Mass media companies established in 2014
Software companies established in 2014
Video game streaming services
Video hosting
Video on demand services
Software companies of China
Companies listed on the Nasdaq
Tencent divisions and subsidiaries
Internet censorship in India